is a railway station on the AbukumaExpress in the city of Date, Fukushima Japan.

Lines

Station layout
Nitta Station has a one side platform a single bi-directional track. The station is unattended.

Adjacent stations

History
Nitta Station opened on July 1, 1988.

Passenger statistics
In fiscal 2015, the station was used by an average of 150 passengers daily (boarding passengers only).

Surrounding area
The station is located in a suburban residential district of Date.

See also
 List of Railway Stations in Japan

External links

  Abukuma Express home page

References

Railway stations in Fukushima Prefecture
Abukuma Express Line
Railway stations in Japan opened in 1988
Date, Fukushima